The Japanese wrinkled frog (Glandirana rugosa) is a species of true frog native to Japan and introduced to Hawaii in the late 19th century. It has sometimes been regarded as a single species with the Imienpo Station frog (Glandirana emeljanovi) which is found on the East Asian mainland. The two species are distinguished from others by their rough and uneven skin. It lives and breeds in various freshwater environments, including ponds, streams and wetlands. The IUCN does not consider this species to be faced by any significant threats.

References

Glandirana
Endemic amphibians of Japan
Amphibians described in 1838